Herbert Turner may refer to:

Herbert Turner (bishop) (1888–1968), British bishop
Herbert Hall Turner (1861–1930), British astronomer and seismologist
Herbert Turner (footballer born 1899), English footballer who played for Merthyr Town, Coventry City, Torquay United and Bristol Rovers
Herbert Turner (footballer born 1909), Welsh international footballer who played for Charlton Athletic
Herb Turner (1921–2002), Australian rules footballer
Herb Turner (rower) (1910–1998), Australian Olympic rower

See also
Bert Turner (disambiguation)